Hishikawa (written: 菱川 lit. "diamond river") is a Japanese surname. Notable people with the surname include:

 (1618–1694), Japanese ukiyo-e artist
 (born 1969), Japanese art director

Fictional characters:
, character in the anime series Dokidoki! PreCure

Japanese-language surnames